Nathalie Baudone-Furlan (born 12 July 1972) is a former professional tennis player from Italy.

Biography
Baudone was born in Belgium but represented Italy during her career. As a junior she reached the girls' doubles semi-finals at the 1990 US Open, with Silvia Farina Elia. She won two medals at the 1991 Mediterranean Games in Athens, a gold partnering Katia Piccolini in the doubles and a bronze in the singles event.

Professional tennis
Baudone's first WTA Tour quarter-final came in 1992, at the Internazionali Femminili di Palermo tournament in her home country. In 1993 she reached her highest ranking of 71 in the world, soon after reaching the third round of the French Open. At the 1993 US Open she lost a close match to 13th seed Mary Pierce in the first round, which was decided by a final set tie-break. She also was a quarter-finalist at Linz that year. At the 1994 Canadian Open she won three matches to make her third WTA Tour quarter-final. Her run in the tournament, which was a Tier I event, included wins over seeded players Nathalie Tauziat and Lori McNeil. She made the third round of both the French Open and US Open in 1995. Notably her performance at the French Open included becoming the first player to beat Amélie Mauresmo in a Grand Slam match and ended at the hands of eventual champion Steffi Graf. In 1996 she appeared in three Fed Cup ties for Italy, against Sweden, Norway and Belarus.

Personal life
Baudone has been married to former Italian tennis player Renzo Furlan since 1996.

ITF finals

Singles (2–0)

Doubles (3-1)

References

External links
 
 
 

1972 births
Living people
Italian female tennis players
Sportspeople from Liège
Italian people of Belgian descent
Mediterranean Games gold medalists for Italy
Mediterranean Games bronze medalists for Italy
Naturalised citizens of Italy
Naturalised tennis players
Mediterranean Games medalists in tennis
Competitors at the 1991 Mediterranean Games
20th-century Italian women
21st-century Italian women